Whatley may refer to:

Places
Whatley, Alabama, a place in the United States
Whatley, Mendip, in the district of Mendip, Somerset, England
Whatley, South Somerset, in the district of South Somerset, Somerset, England

People
Whatley (surname), people with the surname

See also
Whatley Manor, hotel and restaurant in Wiltshire, England
Whately (disambiguation)